

Chart
The song with the most weeks in chart is Katy Perry's "California Gurls" with Snoop Dogg with 28 weeks. Coming close in second was Taio Cruz's "Dynamite" with 26 weeks but even so none of them received the peak position. The number one spot was achieved by New Zealand RnB sensation J. Williams featuring great rapper Scribe with the single "You Got Me". This gave both singers a great achievements. You Got Me being the first New Zealand annual number 1 single in 6 years since Ben Lummis's "They Can't Take That Away", and Scribe becoming the first artist ever to have 2 year end number 1 singles the other being "Stand Up/Not Many".

The biggest-selling single not to reach number one was Nesian Mystik's "Sun Goes Down"

Key
 – Song of New Zealand origin

Top 20 singles of 2010 by New Zealand artists 

*numbers 10 through 20 are currently unavailable

Notes

References

2010 in New Zealand music
2010 record charts
Singles 2010